John Turner MacGregor-Morris (1872-1959) was a professor of electrical engineering at Queen Mary University of London. His papers are held by the Queen Mary Archives.

Selected publications
 Cathode Ray Oscillography. 1936. (with J.A. Henley)
 Sir Ambrose Fleming and the Birth of the Valve. 1954.

References 

1872 births
1959 deaths
Academics of Queen Mary University of London
English electrical engineers